Étienne Fouvry is a French mathematician working primarily in analytic number theory.

In 1985, Fouvry showed that the first case of Fermat's Last Theorem is true for infinitely many primes.

References

External links 
 Videos of Étienne Fouvry in the AV-Portal of the German National Library of Science and Technology

French mathematicians
Academic staff of Paris-Sud University
Living people
Number theorists
École Normale Supérieure alumni
1953 births